The 12151 / 12152 Lokmanya Tilak Terminus–Howrah Samarsata Express is a Superfast Express train belonging to Indian Railways – Central Railways zone that runs between Lokmanya Tilak Terminus and  in India. It is named after Samarasta Festival held in Nagpur

It operates as train number 12151 from Lokmanya Tilak Terminus to Howrah Junction and as train number 12152 in the reverse direction, serving the states of Maharashtra, Chhattisgarh, Odisha, Jharkhand & West Bengal.

Coaches

The 12151 / 12152 Lokmanya Tilak Terminus–Howrah Samarsata Express presently has 1 AC 1st Class,  2 AC 2 tier, 5 AC 3 tier, 8 Sleeper Class, 3 Second Class seating & 2 SLR (Seating cum Luggage Rake) coaches. In addition, it carries a pantry car.

As with most train services in India, coach composition may be amended at the discretion of Indian Railways depending on demand.

Service

The 12151 / 12152 Samarsata Express covers the distance of 2081 kilometres in 35 hours 50 mins as 12151 Lokmanya Tilak Terminus–Howrah Samarsata Express (58.07 km/hr) & 2091 kilometres in 34 hrs 15 mins as 12152 Howrah–Lokmanya Tilak Terminus Samarsata Express (61.05 km/hr).

As the average speed of the train is above 55 km/hr, as per Indian Railways rules, its fare includes a superfast surcharge.

Routeing

Traction

Initially a WCAM-3 from the Kalyan shed would haul the train from Lokmanya Tilak Terminus up to  handing over to a -based WAP-4 which powers the train until .

With Central Railway progressively moving towards a complete changeover from DC to AC traction, it has recently started being hauled end to end by a -based WAP-4 / WAP-7 locomotive.

Timings

 12151 Lokmanya Tilak Terminus–Howrah Samarsata Express leaves Lokmanya Tilak Terminus every Wednesday & Thursday at 20:35 hrs IST and reaches Howrah Junction at 08:25 hrs IST on the 3rd day.
 12152 Howrah–Lokmanya Tilak Terminus Samarsata Express leaves Howrah Junction every Friday & Saturday at 21:15 hrs IST and reaches Lokmanya Tilak Terminus at 07:30 hrs IST on the 3rd day.

External links

References 

Transport in Mumbai
Rail transport in Howrah
Express trains in India
Rail transport in Maharashtra
Rail transport in Chhattisgarh
Rail transport in Odisha
Rail transport in Jharkhand
Rail transport in West Bengal
Named passenger trains of India